Earthquake Glue is the 14th record by Dayton, Ohio rock group Guided by Voices. Working titles for the album included "Model Prisoners of the 5 Sense Realm", "Live Like Kings Forever", and "All Sinners Welcome". The first 25,000 copies were packaged in a numbered limited-edition digipak. Some copies of Earthquake Glue contained a golden ticket; people with a golden ticket were entitled to a free copy of the anthology box set Hardcore UFOs: Revelations, Epiphanies and Fast Food in the Western Hemisphere.

Reception

Earthquake Glue met with some critical acclaim. At Metacritic, which assigns a weighted average score out of 100 to reviews and ratings from mainstream critics, the album received a metascore of 78, based on 20 reviews, indicating "generally favorable reviews." Mark Deming of AllMusic said that it "may well be the most consistent and satisfying Guided By Voices album to date."

Track listing
All songs written by Robert Pollard.
"My Kind of Soldier" – 2:36
"My Son, My Secretary, My Country" – 1:57
"I'll Replace You with Machines" – 2:49
"She Goes Off at Night" – 2:03
"Beat Your Wings" – 4:47
"Useless Inventions" – 2:53
"Dirty Water" – 3:27
"The Best of Jill Hives" – 2:42
"Dead Cloud" – 3:12
"Mix Up the Satellite" – 3:23
"The Main Street Wizards" – 3:22
"A Trophy Mule in Particular" – 2:19
"Apology in Advance" – 2:32
"Secret Star" – 4:42
"Of Mites and Men" – 2:33

Personnel 
The credits do not give specific instruments played by each individual, but rather list every performer who appeared on the release in any capacity.

GBV 

 Robert Pollard - Vocals, composer
 Doug Gillard - performer
 Kevin March - performer
 Nate Farley - performer
 Tim Tobias - performer

Other/production 

 Todd Tobias - Production, keyboards, noises, ambience

References 

Guided by Voices albums
2003 albums
Matador Records albums